The Cronese Mountains are found in the Mojave Desert of San Bernardino County, California in the United States.

Geography
The small range is found north of Interstate 15, southwest of the town of Baker. The mountains are located at the northwestern edge of the Devils Playground and Mojave National Preserve.

The eastern part of the range lies between East and West Cronese Dry Lakes, and the Arrowhead Trail (Arrowhead Highway) runs along the range near the freeway.

Its name may derive from that of Titus F. Cronise, author of The Natural Wealth of California and a pioneer.

See also

References

Mountain ranges of Southern California
Mountain ranges of the Mojave Desert
Mountain ranges of San Bernardino County, California
Mojave National Preserve